The Karnataka Rakshana Vedike, popularly known as, KaRaVe and abbreviated as the KRV (English: Our Karnataka Protection Forum) is an organization located in the state of Karnataka, India. The organization  has more than 6 million (as of 2012) members enrolled from around the world spanning to about 12,000 branches across Karnataka in all 30 districts as well as international branches in the US, UK, UAE, Singapore, Canada, Australia, New Zealand, Saudi Arabia and Malaysia.

Agitations

Belagavi border dispute 

The Belagavi  border dispute is a dispute involving the Indian states of Karnataka and Maharashtra. Belagavi, currently a part of Karnataka and earlier the erstwhile Bombay Presidency, is claimed by Maharashtra on linguistic grounds.
On 11 November 2005, KRV activists daubed Belgaum Mayor Vijay More's face with black paint(and later surrendered to the police) in the wake of Belgaum City Corporation (BCC) passing a resolution to include the district of Belgaum into Maharashtra, a neighbouring state. Upon his return to Belgaum, Vijay More was served with several show-cause notices by the Government of Karnataka and later dissolved the council.

Following this incident, in the following year's election, Mrs. Prashanta Budavi, wife of KRV City President Mr. Shantinath Budavi was appointed as mayor of the Belgaum City Corporation. Maharashtra has asked to bring 865 disputed villages including Belgaum under centre's rule until Supreme court's final verdict. N.D Patil, head of legal-committee appointed by Maharashtra government said that Karnataka is intensifying the problem. He added that Marathi people of border region are not able to live with honour and dignity under Karnataka's rule pointing out to the 'unconstitutional' dissolution of Belgaum municipal council and manhandling of Belgaum mayor by Kannada activists at Bangalore.

Kaveri dispute 

Within 20 minutes of the release of the Kaveri Tribunal Award, KRV called for a total bandh (civil strike) in Karnataka. According to the Vedike's claims which were reflected in the press and media, the aim of the bandh was "to make the Centre and the common man realize that the award was not fair to Karnataka." The bandh - originally scheduled for 8 Feb 2007, ultimately happened on 12 February 2007. It was completely successful in all the districts of Karnataka.

On 4 May 2007, about 200,000 activists of the Karnataka Rakshana Vedike (coming from all the 29 districts of Karnataka) and other organizations like the Karnataka Raita Sangha protested in New Delhi against the gazetting of the Kaveri Water Disputes Tribunal Award of 2007. The Vedike presented a memorandum to Prime Minister Manmohan Singh, alleging that historical bias by the colonial British administration against the Kingdom of Mysore was responsible for Karnataka being sidelined in favour of other states like Tamil Nadu.

Hogenakkal project

In 2008, KRV activists protested against the proposed Hogenakal water supply project. by attacking cinema halls screening Tamil movies in Bangalore, and pulling down Tamil movie hoardings and banners. They shouted slogans against Tamil Nadu and M. Karunanidhi (the Chief Minister of Tamil Nadu).

The KRV also threatened to burn Tamil Nadu buses in the State, to use force to stall screening of Tamil movies in Bangalore city and forced television cable operators to stop airing Tamil channels as a protest against Tamil Nadu Chief Minister M Karunanidhi's recent statements on the Hognekkal issue.

Jobs for Kannadigas 
Implementation of Dr. Sarojini Mahishi Report in Karnataka, which recommends job reservations for Kannadigas in government departments, public sector units and even in the private sector, has been one of the major demands of Vedike. It continues to protest against the non-implementation of the report.

Reservations at HAL 
On 8 July 2011 Karnataka Rakshana Vedike members staged a protest at Hindustan Aeronautics Limited (HAL) premises demanding reservation for Kannadigas as per the official language policy applicable to all union Government organizations. Following this, Kannada Development Authority (KDA) chairperson Mukhyamantri Chandru also met with HAL officials and insisted on implementing Dr. Sarojini Mahishi report which recommends 100 percent reservation to locals for 'C' and 'D' category posts. HAL's HR executive director cited ignorance of the fact that even Central Government organizations had to conform to the report's recommendations and assured them of appointing Kannadigas to all of the 677 openings. Besides this, they were also presented facts that 11,262 people of its 15,162 workforce in Bengaluru consisted of Kannadigas.

Kannada's supremacy in Karnataka

Protest against English 
KRV has vehemently opposed what it calls as the imposition of English in Karnataka. There have been incidents of the Vedike activists blackening English signboards in Karnataka (especially Bengaluru) as protest against the non-conformance of commercial establishments with the Govt. of Karnataka rule that all signboards in Karnataka need to have Kannada more prominent than any other language. The Karnataka Shops & Commercial Establishments Act, 1961, under Rule 24-A states that the name board of every establishment shall be in Kannada and if any other language is used, it should be below the Kannada version. Bruhat Bengaluru Mahanagara Palike](Greater Bangalore Municipal Corporation) ] also issued notices to establishments that do not comply to this rule may have their licenses revoked.

Hindi imposition protest 

In 2006, KRV held an "Anti Hindi-imposition conference" at Yavanika, Bengaluru, on 14 September, which is celebrated as Hindi Divas ("Hindi Day") in Central government institutions of India. The aim of the conference was to discuss plans for countering the imposition of Hindi on Kannadigas and the Central Government's Rajbhasha policy.

The conference was attended by K. Rajkumar, Ashok Doddameti, and chaired by T. A. Narayana Gowda.

T. A. Narayana Gowda vehemently opposed this in his speech, and declared that this imposed feeling of inferiority is fatal for the future of Kannadigas. The conference passed a resolution to "celebrate" 14 Sept as "Anti Hindi-imposition day" every year. Twenty-five Vedike activists were arrested on this day for ransacking the office of All India Radio for airing Hindi programmes in lieu of the usual Kannada programmes even after requests against the same.

Assault on doctors for not speaking in Kannada

A mob led by Ashwini gowda attacked female doctors at Minto hospital for not speaking in Kannada. This led to state wide protests by doctors. Finally 12 members were arrested and released on bail.

External links 
 Official Website of Karnataka Rakshana Vedike

References

Organisations based in Karnataka
Regionalism in India
Year of establishment missing